Daniel McLachlin (1810 – February 6, 1872) was a businessman and political figure in Canada West. He represented Renfrew South in the 1st Canadian Parliament as a Liberal from 1867 to 1869.

He was born in Pointe-Fortune in Lower Canada in 1810 and had entered the timber trade in the Ottawa Valley by 1834. In 1837, he moved to Bytown and purchased cutting rights along the Ottawa River, Madawaska River and Indian Rivers. He built sawmills and gristmills at the Chaudière Falls on the Ottawa. He also operated a general store in Bytown with his brother Hugh until 1855. In 1851, he relocated his timber business to the nearly deserted village of Arnprior, using the power of the Madawaska River to operate his mills. He also helped promote the development of the settlement there. He had bridges built, helped to bring people in, and took a leading role in promoting public improvements. Two of these involved the Madawaska River Improvement Association (later Company) and a wagon road on the Madawaska River from Arnprior to the Long Rapids. The same year, he was elected to the Legislative Assembly for Bytown; he did not run in 1854 but was elected in 1861 for Renfrew. In 1867, he was elected by acclamation to the 1st Canadian Parliament for Renfrew South. He resigned from politics and his business in 1869, leaving the business to his sons, who he'd brought into the business in 1865. He died in Arnprior in 1872.

Family
McLachlin was born to Hugh McLachlin, son of Donald McLachlin, and Janet (née McLean). He had many siblings; Mary (born 1795), Alexander (b. 1796), John (b. 1798), Flora (b. 1800), Janet (b. 1802), Dorothy (b. 1804), Ann (b. 1806), Catharine (b. 1810), William (b. 1813), Hugh (b. 1816), Sara (b. 1820), and Christina. Daniel McLachlin had eight children with Maria Harrington; Jessie, William, Harriet, Hugh, John, Daniel, Eric, and Claude.

The family names of the known direct descendants of McLachlin are McLachlin, Hall, Masters, Robertson, Stratford, Prain, Robinson, Davies, Allan, Kenny, Echlin, and Spicer. Alternative spellings of 'McLachlin' have no relation to Daniel.

References

Biography at the Dictionary of Canadian Biography Online
 

1810 births
1872 deaths
Members of the Legislative Assembly of the Province of Canada from Canada West
Members of the House of Commons of Canada from Ontario
Liberal Party of Canada MPs
Pre-Confederation Canadian businesspeople
People from Renfrew County